Yalamık is a village in Tarsus district of Mersin Province, Turkey. It is situated in the Berdan River valley to the south of Kadıncık Dam reservoir. The population of village is 272  as of 2011.

References

Villages in Tarsus District